Nallavadu is a village in Ariyankuppam Commune in the Union Territory of Puducherry, India.  Part of the village lies in the Cuddalore district of Tamil Nadu, and is governed by Singirikudi village panchayat.  It is by far the tiniest exclave of Tamil Nadu within Puducherry.

Geography
Nallavadu is bordered by Chunnambar river in the north, Bay of Bengal and Nallavadu(Tamil Nadu) in the east, Panithittu and Madalapet(Tamil Nadu) in the south, Pooranankuppam, Pillaiyarthittu and Andiarpalayam in the West. Nallavadu is surrounded by sea and back-waters and it is one of the beautiful small island in Puducherry.

Demographics
Nallavadu has an average literacy rate of 80.51%, male literacy is 84.89%, and female literacy is 76.13%. In Nallavadu, 12% of the population is under 6 years of age. People here are well educated and spread across the globe. It has school, hospital, library, hotels, groceries shops & markets are available for people's daily routines.

Transport
Nallavadu is located at 2.2 km from Thavalakuppam on Thavalakuppam–Nallavadu Road. One can reach Thavalakuppam Koot Road by any local bus from Pondicherry to Bahoor, Madukarai and Karaiyanputtur running via Ariyankuppam or any route bus from Pondicherry to Cuddalore, Chidambaram and Karaikal running via ECR. From Thavalakuppam Koot Road, you have to walk 2.2 km towards east to reach Nallavadu. Auto rickshaws are available around the clock (24x7) at Thavalakuppam to reach Nallavadu. Nallavadu can also be reached directly by PRTC Bus (Route No. 14A) running between Pondicherry and Nallavadu.

Road Network
Nallavadu is connected to Pondicherry by Thavalakuppam–Nallavadu Road. Alternate route Thavalakuppam–Poornankuppam-Pudukuppaam-Nallavadu

Tourism

Angalamman Koil
Arulmigu Angalamman Koil is one of the oldest temple in Nallavadu. Vellalan Kottai & Mayana Kollai of Angalaman koil are very famous here in this village.

Arulmigu Manonmani Amman Koil
Arulmigu Manonmani Amman Koil is one of the oldest temple in Nallavadu. Sedal & kavadi ursavam of Manonmani amman temple are very famous in this village.

Arulmigu Muthalamman Amman Koil
Arulmigu Muthalamman Koil is one of the oldest temple in Nallavadu. Sedal ursavam & ther ottam of Muthalamman temple are very famous in this village.

Kutti Aandavar Koil
Kutti aandavar kovil is one of the oldest temple and it is located in south border of Nallavadu. aadi thiruvizha is very famous in this village.

Nallavadu Beach
Nallavadu beach is very famous for virgin sandy beach in pondicherry. It is 2.5 km long and it is hard to find footpath on south side of the beach as no residents in those areas.

Fish Market
Nallavadu Fish Market is the very famous fish market in Pondicherry, people in this village go for fishing everyday and we can get fresh sea foods in this market all time.

Kailash Beach Resort

Le Pondy Beach Resort

Seagull/Paradise Beach

Chunnambar Boat House

Villages under Nallavadu Village Panchayat
 Nallavadu
 Pudukuppam

Politics
Nallavadu is part of Manavely assembly constituency, and forms part of Puducherry Lok Sabha constituency.

References

External links
Official website of the Government of the Union Territory of Puducherry
Kailash Beach Resort
Le Pondy Beach Resort

Villages in Puducherry district
Ariyankuppam